Trimbakeshwar Shiva Temple (श्री त्र्यंबकेश्वर ज्योतिर्लिंग मंदिर) is an ancient Hindu temple in the town of Trimbak, in the Trimbakeshwar tehsil in the Nashik District of Maharashtra, India, 28 km from the city of Nashik and 40 km from Nashik road. It is dedicated to Hindu god Shiva and is one of the twelve jyotirlingas where the Hindu genealogy registers at Trimbakeshwar, Maharashtra are kept. The origin of the sacred Godavari river is near Trimbak.

Kusavarta kunda (sacred pond) in the temple premises, built by Shrimant Sardar Raosaheb Parnerkar who was the Fadnavis of Indore State, is the source of the Godavari River, the second longest river in peninsular India. A bust of Sardar Fadnavis and his wife can be seen on the edge of the kunda. The current temple was built by Peshwa Balaji Baji Rao after it was destroyed by Mughal ruler Aurangzeb

Architecture
The temple is located between three hills namely Brahmagiri, Nilagiri and Kalagiri. The temple has three lingas (an iconic form of Shiv) representing Shiv, Vishnu and Brahma. There are three other bodies of water, namely, Bilvatirtha, Viswanantirtha and Mukundatirtha. There are images of various deities, namely, Gangadevi, Jaleswara, Rameswara, Gautameswara, Kedarnatha, Rama, Krishna, Parasurama and Lakshmi Narayana. The temple has also several monasteries and samadhis of saints.

Jyotirlinga

As per the Shiva Purana, once Brahma (the Hindu God of creation) and Vishnu (the Hindu God of preservation) had an argument in terms of supremacy of creation. To test them, Shiva pierced the three worlds as a huge endless pillar of light, the jyotirlinga. Vishnu and Brahma split their ways to downwards and upwards respectively to find the end of the light in either direction. Brahma lied that he found out the end, while Vishnu conceded his defeat.  Shiva appeared as the second pillar of light and cursed Brahma that he would have no place in ceremonies while Vishnu would be worshipped till the end of eternity. The jyotirlinga is the supreme partless reality, out of which Shiva partly appears. The Jyotirlinga shrines, thus are places where Shiva appeared as a fiery column of light. Originally there were believed to be 64 jyotirlingas while 12 of them are considered to be very auspicious and holy. Each of the twelve jyotirlinga sites take the name of the presiding deity - each considered different manifestation of Shiv. At all these sites, the primary image is lingam representing the beginningless and endless Stambha pillar, symbolizing the infinite nature of Shiv. The twelve jyothirlinga are Somnath in Gujarat, Mallikarjuna at Srisailam in Andhra Pradesh, Mahakaleswar at Ujjain in Madhya Pradesh, Omkareshwar in Madhya Pradesh, Kedarnath in Himalayas, Bhimashankar in Maharashtra, Viswanath at Varanasi in Uttar Pradesh, Trimbakeshwar in Maharashtra, Vaidyanath at Deoghar in Jharkhand, Nageshwar Temple at Dwaraka in Gujarat, Rameshwar at Rameswaram in Tamil Nadu and Grishneshwar at Aurangabad in Maharashtra.

Lord Shiva showed himself as a Jyotirlinga on the night of the Aridra Nakshatra. It is believed that a person can see the Jyotirlingas as columns of fire piercing through the earth as he reaches a higher level of spiritual attainment. Each Jyotirlinga site takes the name of the presiding deity. Basically, the Jyotirlinga signifies the infinite nature of Lord Shiv. At the highest level, Shiva is regarded as formless, limitless, transcendent and unchanging absolute Brahman and the primal Atman (soul, self) of the universe.

Genealogy registers
Hindu genealogy registers at Trimbakeshwar are the genealogy registers of pilgrims maintained here by pandits.

Temple Legend

Trimbakeshwar is a religious center having one of the twelve Jyotirlingas. The extraordinary feature of the Jyotirlinga located here is its three faces embodying Lord Brahma, Lord Vishnu, and Lord Rudra. Due to the excessive use of water, the linga has started to erode. It is said that this erosion symbolizes the eroding nature of human society. The Lingas are covered by a jeweled crown which is placed over the Gold Mask of Tridev (Brahma Vishnu Mahesh). The crown is said to be from the age of Pandavs and consists of diamonds, emeralds, and many precious stones. The crown is displayed every Monday from 4-5 pm (Shiv).

All other Jyotirlingas have Shiva as the main deity. The entire black stone temple is known for its appealing architecture and sculpture and is at the foothills of a mountain called Brahmagiri. Three sources of the Godavari originate from the Brahmagiri mountain.

Story related to the Godavari river

Brahmadev worshipped God Trivikram when he came to Satya Loka (on earth) with the same holy water of the Ganges, to get the river Ganges held up by God Shankar on his head, to flow. There was a famine of 24 years and people were affected by the pangs of hunger. However, Varun - the God of Rains, pleased with Sage Gautama arranged rains every day in Gautama's Ashram (dwelling place) which was in Trimbakeshwar. Gautama used to sow rice in the surrounding fields of his Ashram in the morning, reap the crop in the afternoon and with it fed a large group of Hrishis, who took shelter in his Ashram on account of the famine. The blessings of the group of rishis increased the merit (Punya) of Gautama. Lord Indra's position became shaky because of his increased merit. So Indra ordered clouds to rain all over Trimbakeshwar, so that the famine will be over and rishis will go back and the increasing merits of Gautama will be weakened. Although the famine was over, Gautama urged the Rishis to stay back and kept on feeding them and gaining merit. Once he saw a cow grazing in the paddy field and he drove her away by throwing Darbha (sharp, pointed grass). The slender cow died by this. It was Jaya - Parvati's friend, who had taken the form of a cow. This news upset the Rishis and they refused to luncheon at his Ashram. Gautama requested Rishis to show a way out of this sin. He was advised to approach Lord Shiva and request him to release the Ganges and a bath in the Ganges would set him free of his sins. Gautama then practiced penance by going to the peak of Brahmagiri for 1000 years. Lord Shankara was pleased by his worships and gave him the Ganges.

However, Ganges was not prepared to part with Lord Shiv, which irritated him. He made TandavNrutya (dance) on the peak of Brahmagiri and dashed his jata there. Frightened by this action, Ganges appeared on Brahmagiri. Later on, Ganges appeared in the Trimbak Tirtha. Gautama praised her but she off and on appeared on the mountain at various places and disappeared in anger. Gautama could not bathe in her waters. The Ganges then appeared in Gangadwar, Varaha-tirtha, Rama-Laxman tirtha, Ganga Sagar tirtha. Still, Gautama could not bathe in her waters. The Gautama surrounded the river with enchanted grass and put a vow to her. The flow stopped there and the tirtha thus came to be called Kushavarta. It is from this Kushavarta that the river Godavari flows up to the sea. The sin of killing a cow by Gautama was wiped off here.

This place is famous for its many religious rituals (vidhis). Narayan Nagbali, Kalsarpa Shanti, Tripindi Vidhi are done here. Narayan Nagbali puja is performed at Trimbakeshwar only. This puja is performed in three days. This puja is performed on special dates. Some days are not suitable to perform this puja. This puja is performed for many reasons like to cure an illness, going through bad times, killing a Cobra (Nag), childless couples, financial crisis or you want to perform some religious puja to have everything.

Trimbakeshwar town has a large number of Brahmin households and is also a centre for Vedic Gurukuls (kind of boarding school). It also has ashrams and Muths devoted to Ashtanga Yoga, the Hindu art of living.

The existing temple was built out of basalt after it was commissioned by Peshwa Nanasaheb. It so happens that the Peshwa made a bet on whether the stone surrounding the Jyotirlinga, is hollow from the inside or not. The stone was proved to be hollow, and on losing the bet, the Peshwa built a marvelous temple out of it.

The Shiva deity of the temple consisted of the world-famous Nassak Diamond. It was looted by the British in The Third Anglo-Maratha War and lies with one owner or the other ever since. The diamond presently lies with Edward J. Hand, a trucking firm executive from Greenwich, Connecticut, USA

The place is known for its scenic beauty in rainy/monsoon season and is surrounded by lush green hills untouched by pollution. Anjaneri mountain, the birthplace of Lord Hanuman, is 7 km from Trimbakeshwar.

Shri Nilambika/Dattatreya/ Matamba Temple

This temple is on top of the Neel mountain. All goddesses ('Matamba', 'Renuka', 'Mananmba') came here to see 'Parashuram' when he was performing penance (tapas). After his penance, he requested all goddesses to stay there and the temple was formed for these goddesses.

Akhil Bhartiya Shree Swami Samarth Gurupeeth, Trimbakeshwar Temple of Shri Swami Samarth Maharaj. This temple is 1 km from Shiva Temple. This temple is a marvelous example of Vastu Shastra.

Connectivity
The Trimbakeshwar Shiva Temple is 30 kilometers on road from Nashik, and 157 kilometers from Thane. The best way to reach the temple is by road. The closest railway station is the Nashik Road Railway Station that is 39 kilometers by road.

References

Notes

.

External links

Trimbakeshwar Trust Website 
Pandit/Purohit Website
https://templeknowledge.com/about-trimbakeshwar-temple/

 

Jyotirlingas
Hindu temples in Maharashtra
Buildings and structures in Nashik district
Tourist attractions in Nashik district
Religious tourism
Religious tourism in India
Shiva